Valentin Annala (18 November 1859, Ilmajoki - 19 October 1926) was a Finnish railway guard, noncommissioned officer and politician. He was a member of the Parliament of Finland from 1909 to 1918 and again from 1924 until his death in 1926, representing the Social Democratic Party of Finland (SDP). He was imprisoned from 1918 to 1919 for having sided with the Reds during the Finnish Civil War.

References

1859 births
1926 deaths
People from Ilmajoki
People from Vaasa Province (Grand Duchy of Finland)
Social Democratic Party of Finland politicians
Members of the Parliament of Finland (1909–10)
Members of the Parliament of Finland (1910–11)
Members of the Parliament of Finland (1911–13)
Members of the Parliament of Finland (1913–16)
Members of the Parliament of Finland (1916–17)
Members of the Parliament of Finland (1917–19)
Members of the Parliament of Finland (1924–27)
People of the Finnish Civil War (Red side)
Prisoners and detainees of Finland